Whirlin is a protein that in humans is encoded by the DFNB31 gene.

In rat brain, WHRN interacts with a calmodulin-dependent serine kinase, CASK, and may be involved in the formation of scaffolding protein complexes that facilitate synaptic transmission in the central nervous system (CNS). Mutations in this gene, also known as WHRN, cause autosomal recessive deafness.

Model organisms

Model organisms have been used in the study of WHRN function. A conditional knockout mouse line, called Whrntm1a(EUCOMM)Wtsi was generated as part of the International Knockout Mouse Consortium program — a high-throughput mutagenesis project to generate and distribute animal models of disease to interested scientists.

Male and female animals underwent a standardized phenotypic screen to determine the effects of deletion. Twenty tests were carried out on mutant mice and two significant abnormalities were observed. Whrntm1a(EUCOMM)Wtsi homozygote mice show a moderate to severe hearing loss at 14 weeks. Female homozygous mutant animals also displayed an increased thermal nociceptive threshold in a hot plate test.

References

Further reading

External links
  GeneReviews/NCBI/NIH/UW entry on Usher Syndrome Type II

Genes mutated in mice